

Events

Pre-1600
202 BC – Second Punic War: At the Battle of Zama, Roman legions under Scipio Africanus defeat Hannibal Barca, leader of the army defending Carthage.
 439 – The Vandals, led by King Gaiseric, take Carthage in North Africa.
1216 – King John of England dies at Newark-on-Trent and is succeeded by his nine-year-old son Henry.
1386 – The Universität Heidelberg holds its first lecture, making it the oldest German university.
1453 – Hundred Years' War: Three months after the Battle of Castillon, England loses its last possessions in southern France.
1466 – The Thirteen Years' War between Poland and the Teutonic Order ends with the Second Treaty of Thorn.
1469 – Ferdinand II of Aragon marries Isabella I of Castile, a marriage that paves the way to the unification of Aragon and Castile into a single country, Spain.
1512 – Martin Luther becomes a doctor of theology.
1579 – James VI of Scotland is celebrated as an adult ruler by a festival in Edinburgh.
1596 – The Spanish ship San Felipe runs aground on the coast of Japan and its cargo is confiscated by local authorities

1601–1900
1649 – New Ross town in Ireland surrenders to Oliver Cromwell.
1781 – American Revolutionary War: The siege of Yorktown comes to an end.
1789 – John Jay is sworn in as the first Chief Justice of the United States.
1805 – War of the Third Coalition: Austrian General Mack surrenders his army to Napoleon at the Battle of Ulm.
1812 – The French invasion of Russia fails when Napoleon begins his retreat from Moscow.
1813 – War of the Sixth Coalition: Napoleon is forced to retreat from Germany after the Battle of Leipzig.
1864 – American Civil War: The Battle of Cedar Creek ends the last Confederate threat to Washington, DC.
  1864   – American Civil War: Confederate agents based in Canada rob three banks in Saint Albans, Vermont.
1866 – In accordance with the Treaty of Vienna, Austria cedes Veneto and Mantua to France, which immediately awards them to Italy in exchange for the earlier Italian acquiescence to the French annexation of Savoy and Nice.
1900 – Max Planck discovers Planck's law of black-body radiation.

1901–present
1912 – Italo-Turkish War: Italy takes possession of what is now Libya from the Ottoman Empire.
1914 – World War I: The First Battle of Ypres begins.
1921 – The Portuguese Prime Minister and several officials are murdered in the Bloody Night coup.
1922 – British Conservative MPs vote to terminate the coalition government with the Liberal Party. 
1935 – The League of Nations places economic sanctions on Italy for its invasion of Ethiopia.
1943 – The cargo vessel Sinfra is attacked by Allied aircraft at Crete and sunk. Two thousand and ninety-eight Italian prisoners of war drown with it.
  1943   – Streptomycin, the first antibiotic remedy for tuberculosis, is isolated by researchers at Rutgers University.
1944 – United States forces land in the Philippines.
  1944   – A coup is launched against Juan Federico Ponce Vaides, beginning the ten-year Guatemalan Revolution.
1950 – China defeats the Tibetan Army at Chambo.
  1950   – Korean War: The Battle of Pyongyang ends in a United Nations victory. Hours later, the Chinese Army begins crossing the border into Korea.
  1950   – Iran becomes the first country to accept technical assistance from the United States under the Point Four Program.
1955 – The General Assembly of the European Broadcasting Union approves the staging of the first Eurovision Song Contest.
1956 – The Soviet Union and Japan sign a Joint Declaration, officially ending the state of war between the two countries that had existed since August 1945.
1960 – The United States imposes a near-total trade embargo against Cuba.
1973 – President Nixon rejects an Appeals Court decision that he turn over the Watergate tapes.
1974 – Niue becomes a self-governing colony of New Zealand.
1984 – A Roman Catholic priest, Jerzy Popiełuszko, associated with the Solidarity Union, is killed by three agents of the Polish Communist internal intelligence agency.
1986 – The president of Mozambique and a prominent leader of FRELIMO, along with 33 others, die when their aircraft crashes into the Lebombo Mountains.
1987 – The United States Navy conducts Operation Nimble Archer, an attack on two Iranian oil platforms in the Persian Gulf.
  1987   – Black Monday: The Dow Jones Industrial Average falls by 22%, 508 points.
1988 – The British government imposes a broadcasting ban on television and radio interviews with members of Sinn Féin and eleven Irish republican and Ulster loyalist paramilitary groups.
1989 – The convictions of the Guildford Four are quashed by the Court of Appeal of England and Wales, after they had spent 15 years in prison.
2001 – SIEV X, an Indonesian fishing boat en route to Christmas Island, carrying over 400 migrants, sinks in international waters with the loss of 353 people.
2003 – Mother Teresa is beatified by Pope John Paul II.
2004 – Thirteen people are killed when Corporate Airlines Flight 5966 crashes in Adair County, Missouri, whilst on approach to Kirksville Regional Airport.
2005 – Saddam Hussein goes on trial in Baghdad for crimes against humanity.
  2005   – Hurricane Wilma becomes the most intense Atlantic hurricane on record with a minimum pressure of 882 mb.
2012 – A bomb explosion kills eight people and injures 110 more in Lebanon.
2013 – One hundred and five people are injured in a train crash in Buenos Aires.
2019 – Members of Parliament met at the House of Lords to discuss the United Kingdom’s Brexit deal, this was the first Saturday sitting in Parliament since 3 April 1982 during the Falklands War.

Births

Pre-1600
 879 – Yingtian, empress of the Khitan Liao Dynasty (d. 953)
1276 – Prince Hisaaki of Japan (d. 1328)
1433 – Marsilio Ficino, Italian astrologer and philosopher (d. 1499)
1507 – Viglius, Dutch politician (d. 1577)
1545 – John Juvenal Ancina, Italian Oratorian and bishop (d. 1604)
1582 – Dmitry of Uglich, Russian crown prince and saint (d. 1591)

1601–1900
1605 – Thomas Browne, English physician and author (d. 1682)
1609 – Gerrard Winstanley, English Protestant religious reformer (d. 1676)
1610 – James Butler, 1st Duke of Ormonde, English-Irish general, academic, and politician, Lord Lieutenant of Ireland (d. 1688)
1613 – Charles of Sezze, Italian Franciscan friar and saint (d. 1670)
1658 – Adolphus Frederick II, Duke of Mecklenburg-Strelitz (d. 1704)
1676 – Rodrigo Anes de Sá Almeida e Meneses, 1st Marquis of Abrantes, Portuguese diplomat (d. 1733)
1680 – John Abernethy, Irish minister (d. 1740)
1688 – William Cheselden, English surgeon and anatomist (d. 1752)
1718 – Victor-François, 2nd duc de Broglie, French general and politician, French Secretary of State for War (d. 1804)
1720 – John Woolman, American-English preacher, journalist, and activist (d. 1772)
1721 – Joseph de Guignes, French orientalist and sinologist (d. 1800)
1784 – Leigh Hunt, English poet and critic (d. 1859)
1789 – Theophilos Kairis, Greek priest and philosopher (d. 1853)
1810 – Cassius Marcellus Clay, American journalist, lawyer, and diplomat, United States Ambassador to Russia (d. 1903)
1814 – Theodoros Vryzakis, Greek painter (d. 1878)
1826 – Ralph Tollemache, English priest (d. 1895)
1850 – Annie Smith Peck, American mountaineer and academic (d. 1935)
1858 – George Albert Boulenger, Belgian-English zoologist and botanist (d. 1937)
1862 – Auguste Lumière, French director and producer (d. 1954)
1868 – Bertha Knight Landes, American academic and politician, Mayor of Seattle (d. 1943)
1873 – Jaap Eden, Dutch speed skater and cyclist (d. 1925)
  1873   – Bart King, American cricketer (d. 1965)
1876 – Mordecai Brown, American baseball player, coach, and manager (d. 1945)
  1876   – Mihkel Pung, Estonian lawyer and politician, 11th Estonian Minister of Foreign Affairs (d. 1941)
1879 – Emma Bell Miles, American writer, poet, and artist (d. 1919)
1882 – Umberto Boccioni, Italian painter and sculptor (d. 1916)
1885 – Charles E. Merrill, American banker and philanthropist, co-founded Merrill Lynch Wealth Management (d. 1956)
1895 – Frank Durbin, American soldier (d. 1999)
  1895   – Lewis Mumford, American historian, sociologist, and philosopher (d. 1990)
1896 – Bob O'Farrell, American baseball player and manager (d. 1988)
1897 – Salimuzzaman Siddiqui, Pakistani chemist and scholar (d. 1994)
1899 – Miguel Ángel Asturias, Guatemalan journalist, author, and poet, Nobel Prize laureate (d. 1974)
1900 – Erna Berger, German soprano and actress (d. 1990)
  1900   – Bill Ponsford, Australian cricketer and baseball player (d. 1991)
  1900   – Roy Worters, Canadian ice hockey player (d. 1957)

1901–present
1901 – Arleigh Burke, American admiral (d. 1996)
1903 – Tor Johnson, Swedish wrestler and actor (d. 1971)
1907 – Roger Wolfe Kahn, American bandleader and composer (d. 1962)
1908 – Geirr Tveitt, Norwegian pianist and composer (d. 1981)
1909 – Marguerite Perey, French physicist and academic (d. 1975)
1910 – Subrahmanyan Chandrasekhar, Indian-American astrophysicist, astronomer, and mathematician, Nobel Prize laureate (d. 1995)
  1910   – Shunkichi Hamada, Japanese field hockey player (d. 2009)
  1910   – Paul Robert, French lexicographer and publisher (d. 1980)
1913 – Vinicius de Moraes, Brazilian poet, playwright, and composer (d. 1980)
1914 – Juanita Moore, American actress (d. 2014)
1916 – Jean Dausset, French-Spanish immunologist and academic, Nobel Prize laureate  (d. 2009)
  1916   – Emil Gilels, Ukrainian-Russian pianist (d. 1985)
  1916   – Minoru Yasui, American soldier, lawyer, and activist (d. 1986)
1917 – Sharadchandra Shankar Shrikhande, Indian mathematician (d. 2020)
  1917   – William Joel Blass, American soldier, lawyer, and politician (d. 2012)
  1917   – Walter Munk, Austrian-American oceanographer, author, and academic (d. 2019)
1918 – Charles Evans, English-Welsh mountaineer, surgeon, and educator (d. 1995)
  1918   – Russell Kirk, American theorist and author (d. 1994)
  1918   – Robert Schwarz Strauss, American lawyer and diplomat, United States Ambassador to Russia (d. 2014)
1920 – LaWanda Page, American actress (d. 2002)
  1920   – Harry Alan Towers, English-Canadian screenwriter and producer (d. 2009)
  1920   – Pandurang Shastri Athavale, Indian activist, philosopher, and spiritual leader (d. 2003)
  1920   – Peter Aduja, Filipino American Hawaii Legislature representative (d. 2007)
1921 – George Nader, American actor (d. 2002)
1922 – Jack Anderson, American journalist and author (d. 2005)
1923 – Ruth Carter Stevenson, American art collector, founded the Amon Carter Museum of American Art (d. 2013)
  1923   – Baby Dalupan, Filipino basketball player and coach (d. 2016)
1925 – Bernard Hepton, English actor and producer (d. 2018)
  1925   – Czesław Kiszczak, Polish general and politician, 11th Prime Minister of the People's Republic of Poland (d. 2015)
  1925   – Emilio Eduardo Massera, Argentinian admiral (d. 2010)
1926 – Arne Bendiksen, Norwegian singer-songwriter and producer (d. 2009)
  1926   – Joel Feinberg, American philosopher and academic (d. 2004)
  1926   – Vladimir Shlapentokh, Ukrainian-American sociologist, historian, political scientist, and academic (d. 2015)
  1926   – Marjorie Tallchief, American ballerina (d. 2021)
1927 – Pierre Alechinsky, Belgian painter and illustrator
  1927   – Stephen Keynes, English businessman (d. 2017)
1928 – Lou Scheimer, American animator, producer, and voice actor, co-founded the Filmation Company (d. 2013)
1929 – Lewis Wolpert, South African-English biologist, author, and academic (d. 2021)
1930 – John Evans, Baron Evans of Parkside, English union leader and politician (d. 2016)
  1930   – Mavis Nicholson, Welsh-English journalist
1931 – Ed Emberley, American author and illustrator
  1931   – John le Carré, English intelligence officer and author (d. 2020)
  1931   – Atsushi Miyagi, Japanese tennis player
1932 – Robert Reed, American actor (d. 1992)
1933 – Brian Booth, Australian cricketer and educator
  1933   – Anthony Skingsley, English air marshal (d. 2019)
1934 – Yakubu Gowon, Nigerian general and politician, 3rd Head of State of Nigeria
  1934   – Dave Guard, American folk music singer-songwriter, arranger, and musician (d. 1991)
1935 – Don Ward, Canadian-American ice hockey player (d. 2014)
1936 – James Bevel, American civil rights activist and minister (d. 2008)
1937 – Marilyn Bell, Canadian swimmer
  1937   – Peter Max, German-American illustrator
  1937   – Terence Thomas, Baron Thomas of Macclesfield, English banker and politician (d. 2018)
1938 – Bill Morris, Baron Morris of Handsworth, Jamaican-English union leader and politician
1939 – David Clark, Baron Clark of Windermere, Scottish academic and politician, Minister for the Cabinet Office
1940 – Larry Chance, American singer-songwriter 
  1940   – Michael Gambon, Irish-British actor 
  1940   – Rosny Smarth, Haitian lawyer and politician, 8th Prime Minister of Haiti
1941 – Peter Thornley, English professional wrestler best known for the ring character Kendo Nagasaki
  1941   – Simon Ward, English actor (d. 2012)
1942 – Andrew Vachss, American lawyer and author (d. 2021)
1943 – Robin Holloway, English composer and academic
  1943   – Takis Ikonomopoulos, Greek footballer and coach
  1943   – L. E. Modesitt, Jr., American author and poet
1944 – George McCrae, American singer
  1944   – Peter Tosh, Jamaican singer-songwriter and guitarist (d. 1987)
1945 – Angus Deaton, Scottish-American economist and academic, Nobel Prize laureate
  1945   – Divine, American drag queen performer, and actor (d. 1988)
  1945   – Patricia Ireland, American lawyer and activist
  1945   – Gloria Jones, American singer-songwriter 
  1945   – John Lithgow, American actor 
  1945   – Jeannie C. Riley, American singer
  1945   – Martin Welz, South African journalist
1946 – Bob Holland, Australian cricketer and surveyor (d. 2017)
  1946   – Philip Pullman, English author and academic
  1946   – Keith Reid, English songwriter and lyricist
1947 – Giorgio Cavazzano, Italian author and illustrator
1948 – James Howard Kunstler, American author and critic
  1948   – Dave Mallow, American voice actor and screenwriter
  1948   – Patrick Simmons, American singer-songwriter and guitarist
1949 – Lynn Dickey, American football player and radio host
  1949   – Jamie McGrigor, English-Scottish politician
1950 – Yeslam bin Ladin, Saudi Arabian-Swiss businessman
1951 – Demetrios Christodoulou, Greek mathematician and physicist
  1951   – Annie Golden, American actress and singer 
  1951   – Kurt Schrader, American veterinarian and politician
1952 – Peter Bone, English accountant and politician
  1952   – Verónica Castro, Mexican actress and singer
1953 – Lionel Hollins, American basketball player and coach
1954 – Sam Allardyce, English footballer and manager
  1954   – Deborah Blum, American journalist and author
  1954   – Joe Bryant, American basketball player and coach
1955 – Dan Gutman, American author
  1955   – LaSalle Ishii, Japanese actor and director
1956 – Steve Doocy, American journalist and author
  1956   – Elena Garanina, Soviet ice dancer and coach
  1956   – Grover Norquist, American activist, founded Americans for Tax Reform
  1956   – Didier Theys, Belgian race car driver and coach
  1956   – Carlo Urbani, Italian physician (d. 2003)
  1956   – Bruce Weber, American basketball player and coach
1957 – Dorinda Clark-Cole, American singer-songwriter and pianist 
  1957   – Ray Richmond, American journalist and critic
  1957   – Karl Wallinger, Welsh singer-songwriter, keyboard player, and producer 
1958 – Carolyn Browne, English diplomat, British Ambassador to Kazakhstan
  1958   – Hiromi Hara, Japanese footballer and manager
  1958   – Tiriel Mora, Australian actor
  1958   – Michael Steele, American journalist and politician, 7th Lieutenant Governor of Maryland
1959 – Nir Barkat, Israeli businessman and politician, Mayor of Jerusalem
  1959   – Martin Kusch, German philosopher and academic
1960 – Dawn Coe-Jones, Canadian golfer (d. 2016)
  1960   – Jennifer Holliday, American actress and singer
  1960   – Takeshi Koshida, Japanese footballer
  1960   – Susan Straight, American author and academic
  1960   – Ayuo Takahashi, Japanese-American singer-songwriter
  1960   – Dan Woodgate, English musician, songwriter, composer, and record producer
1961 – Sunny Deol, Indian actor and producer
  1961   – Cliff Lyons, Australian rugby league player and coach
1962 – Claude Callegari, English YouTube personality (d. 2021)
  1962   – Tracy Chevalier, American-English author
  1962   – Brian Henninger, American golfer
  1962   – Bendik Hofseth, Norwegian saxophonist and composer
  1962   – Evander Holyfield, American boxer and actor
  1962   – Svetlana Zainetdinova, Soviet-Estonian chess player and coach
1963 – Sinitta, American-British singer
1964 – Ty Pennington, American model, carpenter and television host
1965 – Brad Daugherty, American basketball player and sportscaster
  1965   – Todd Park Mohr, American rock singer-songwriter and musician
1966 – Jon Favreau, American actor, director, and screenwriter
  1966   – Dimitris Lyacos, Greek poet and playwright
  1966   – David Vann, American novelist and short story writer
1967 – Amy Carter, American illustrator and activist
  1967   – Yōji Matsuda, Japanese actor
  1967   – Yoko Shimomura, Japanese pianist and composer 
1968 – Rodney Carrington, American comedian, actor, and singer 
1969 – Pedro Castillo, Peruvian politician, 130th President of Peru
  1969   – John Edward, American psychic and author
  1969   – Trey Parker, American actor, animator, producer, and screenwriter
  1969   – Erwin Sánchez, Bolivian footballer and manager
1970 – Andrew Griffiths, English politician
  1970   – Chris Kattan, American actor, producer, and screenwriter
1972 – Keith Foulke, American baseball player
  1972   – Pras, American rapper-songwriter, record producer, and actor  
1973 – Hicham Arazi, Moroccan tennis player
  1973   – Okan Buruk, Turkish footballer and manager
  1973   – Joaquin Gage, Canadian ice hockey player
1975 – Burak Güven, Turkish singer-songwriter and bass player 
1976 – Omar Gooding, American actor and producer
  1976   – Jostein Gulbrandsen, Norwegian guitarist and composer
  1976   – Desmond Harrington, American actor
  1976   – Paul Hartley, Scottish footballer and manager
  1976   – Hiroshi Sakai, Japanese footballer
  1976   – Dan Smith, Canadian ice hockey player
  1976   – Michael Young, American baseball player
1977 – Habib Beye, French-Senegalese footballer
  1977   – Louis-José Houde, Canadian comedian and actor
  1977   – Jason Reitman, Canadian-American director, producer, and screenwriter
  1977   – Raúl Tamudo, Spanish footballer
  1977   – Mo Twister, Filipino radio and television host
1978 – Enrique Bernoldi, Brazilian race car driver
  1978   – Zakhar Dubensky, Russian footballer
  1978   – Henri Sorvali, Finnish guitarist and keyboard player 
1979 – José Luis López, Mexican footballer
  1979   – Brian Robertson, American trombonist 
  1979   – Sachiko Sugiyama, Japanese volleyball player
1980 – José Bautista, Dominican baseball player
  1980   – Rajai Davis, American baseball player
1981 – Leon Bott, Australian rugby league player 
  1981   – Heikki Kovalainen, Finnish race car driver
1982 – Atom Araullo, Filipino journalist
  1982   – Gillian Jacobs, American actress and director
  1982   – Louis Oosthuizen, South African golfer
  1982   – Gonzalo Pineda, Mexican footballer
  1982   – Daan van Bunge, Dutch cricketer
1983 – Rebecca Ferguson, Swedish actress
  1983   – Andy Lonergan, English footballer
  1983   – Cara Santa Maria, American neuroscientist and blogger
1984 – Danka Barteková, Slovak skeet shooter
1987 – Tsunenori Aoki, Japanese actor 
  1987   – Sam Groth, Australian tennis player
1988 – Zeph Ellis, English rapper and producer
  1988   – Markiyan Kamysh, Ukrainian writer
  1988   – Chris Lawrence, Australian rugby league player
1989 – James Gavet, New Zealand rugby league player
  1989   – Miroslav Stoch, Slovakian footballer
  1989   – Rakuto Tochihara, Japanese actor
  1989   – Janine Tugonon, Filipino model and television host
1990 – Tom Kilbey, English footballer
  1990   – Endō Shōta, Japanese sumo wrestler 
  1990   – Janet Leon, Swedish singer-songwriter and dancer 
1991 – Colton Dixon, American singer-songwriter and pianist
1992 – Shiho, Japanese actress and model
1993 – Abby Sunderland, American sailor
1994 – Agnė Sereikaitė, Lithuanian speed skater
1995 – Sammis Reyes, Chilean basketball and American football player
1996 – Bernadeth Pons, Filipino volleyball athlete
1999 – Carlotta Truman, German singer-songwriter

Deaths

Pre-1600
727 – Frithuswith, English saint (b. 650)
 993 – Conrad I, King of Burgundy (b. c. 925)
1216 – John, King of England (b. 1166)
1287 – Bohemond VII, Count of Tripoli
1354 – Yusuf I, Sultan of Granada (b. 1318)
1375 – Cansignorio della Scala, Lord of Verona (b. 1340)
1401 – John Charleton, 4th Baron Cherleton (b. 1362)
1432 – John de Mowbray, 2nd Duke of Norfolk, English politician, Earl Marshal of England (b. 1392)
1587 – Francesco I de' Medici, Grand Duke of Tuscany (b. 1541)
1595 – Philip Howard, 20th Earl of Arundel, English nobleman (b. 1537)

1601–1900
1608 – Martin Delrio, Flemish theologian and author (b. 1551)
1609 – Jacobus Arminius, Dutch Reformed theologian (b. 1560)
1619 – Fujiwara Seika, Japanese philosopher and educator (b. 1561)
1636 – Marcin Kazanowski, Polish politician (b. 1566)
1678 – Samuel Dirksz van Hoogstraten, Dutch painter (b. 1627)
1682 – Thomas Browne, English physician and author (b. 1605)
1723 – Godfrey Kneller, German-English painter (b. 1646)
1745 – Jonathan Swift, Irish satirist and essayist (b. 1667)
1772 – Andrea Belli, Maltese architect and businessman (b. 1703)
1790 – Lyman Hall, American physician and politician, 16th Governor of Georgia (b. 1724)
1796 – Michel de Beaupuy, French general (b. 1755)
1813 – Józef Poniatowski, Polish general (b. 1763)
1815 – Paolo Mascagni, Italian physician and anatomist (b. 1755)
1842 – Aleksey Koltsov, Russian poet and author (b. 1808)
1851 – Marie Thérèse of France (b. 1778)
1856 – William Sprague III, American businessman and politician, 14th Governor of Rhode Island (b. 1799)
1889 – Luís I of Portugal (b. 1838)
1897 – George Pullman, American engineer and businessman, founded the Pullman Company (b. 1831)

1901–present
1901 – Carl Frederik Tietgen, Danish businessman and philanthropist, founded GN Store Nord (b. 1829)
1905 – Virgil Earp, American marshal (b. 1843)
1916 – Ioannis Frangoudis, Greek general and target shooter (b. 1863)
1918 – Harold Lockwood, American actor (b. 1887)
1924 – Louis Zborowski, English race car driver and engineer (b. 1895)
1936 – Lu Xun, Chinese author and critic (b. 1881)
1937 – Ernest Rutherford, New Zealand-English physicist and chemist, Nobel Prize laureate (b. 1871)
1943 – Camille Claudel, French sculptor and illustrator (b. 1864)
1944 – Dénes Kőnig, Hungarian mathematician (b. 1884)
1945 – Plutarco Elías Calles, Mexican general and politician, 40th President of Mexico (b. 1877)
  1945   – N. C. Wyeth, American painter and illustrator (b. 1882)
1950 – Edna St. Vincent Millay, American poet and playwright (b. 1892)
1952 – Edward S. Curtis, American ethnologist and photographer (b. 1868)
1956 – Isham Jones, American saxophonist, songwriter, and bandleader (b. 1894)
1960 – Hjalmar Dahl, Finnish journalist, translator and writer (b. 1891)
  1960   – George Wallace, Australian comedian, actor, and screenwriter (b. 1895)
1961 – Şemsettin Günaltay, Turkish historian and politician, 9th Prime Minister of Turkey (b. 1883)
1964 – Sergey Biryuzov, Marshal of the Soviet Union (b. 1904)
  1964   – Nettie Palmer, Australian poet and critic (b. 1885)
  1964   – Christopher Vane, 10th Baron Barnard, English soldier and politician, Lord Lieutenant of Durham (b. 1888)
1965 – Edward Willis Redfield, American painter and educator (b. 1869)
1969 – Lacey Hearn, American sprinter (b. 1881)
1970 – Lázaro Cárdenas, Mexican general and politician, 44th President of Mexico (b. 1895)
1978 – Gig Young, American actor (b. 1913)
1983 – Maurice Bishop, Aruban-Grenadian lawyer and politician, 2nd Prime Minister of Grenada (b. 1944)
1984 – Jerzy Popiełuszko, Polish priest and activist (b. 1947)
1985 – Alfred Rouleau, Canadian businessman (b. 1915)
1986 – Dele Giwa, Nigerian journalist, co-founded Newswatch Magazine (b. 1947)
  1986   – Samora Machel, Mozambican commander and politician, 1st President of Mozambique (b. 1933)
1987 – Jacqueline du Pré, English cellist and educator (b. 1945)
  1987   – Hermann Lang, German race car driver (b. 1909)
1988 – Son House, American singer and guitarist (b. 1902)
1992 – Magnus Pyke, English scientist and television host (b. 1908)
1994 – Martha Raye, American actress and comedian (b. 1916)
1995 – Don Cherry, American trumpet player (b. 1936)
  1995   – Harilaos Perpessas, Greek pianist and composer (b. 1907)
1996 – Shamsuddin Qasemi, Bangladeshi Islamic scholar and politician (b. 1935)
1997 – Glen Buxton, American guitarist and songwriter (b. 1947)
  1997   – Ken Wood, inventor of the Kenwood Chef food mixer (b. 1916)
1999 – James C. Murray, American soldier, lawyer, and politician (b. 1917)
  1999   – Nathalie Sarraute, Russian-French lawyer and author (b. 1900)
2002 – Nikolay Rukavishnikov, Russian physicist and astronaut (b. 1932)
2003 – Road Warrior Hawk, American wrestler (b. 1957)
  2003   – Alija Izetbegović, Bosniak lawyer and politician, 1st President of Bosnia and Herzegovina (b. 1925)
  2003   – Margaret Murie, American environmentalist and author (b. 1902)
  2003   – Nello Pagani, Italian motorcycle racer and race car driver (b. 1911)
2005 – Ryan Dallas Cook, American trombonist (b. 1982)
2006 – James Glennon, American cinematographer (b. 1942)
  2006   – Phyllis Kirk, American actress (b. 1927)
2007 – Winifred Asprey, American mathematician and computer scientist (b. 1917)
  2007   – Randall Forsberg, American activist and author (b. 1943)
  2007   – Michael Maidens, English footballer (b. 1987)
  2007   – Jan Wolkers, Dutch author, sculptor, and painter (b. 1925)
2008 – Richard Blackwell, American actor, fashion designer, and critic (b. 1922)
2009 – Howard Unruh, American murderer (b. 1921)
  2009   – Joseph Wiseman, Canadian-American actor (b. 1918)
2010 – Tom Bosley, American actor (b. 1927)
2011 – Kakkanadan, Indian author (b. 1935)
2012 – Lincoln Alexander, Canadian lawyer and politician, 24th Lieutenant Governor of Ontario (b. 1922)
  2012   – Wissam al-Hassan, Lebanese general (b. 1965)
  2012   – Wiyogo Atmodarminto, Indonesian general and politician, 10th Governor of Jakarta (b. 1922)
  2012   – Mike Graham, American wrestler (b. 1951)
  2012   – Fiorenzo Magni, Italian cyclist (b. 1920)
2013 – John Bergamo, American drummer and composer (b. 1940)
  2013   – Noel Harrison, English singer, actor, and skier (b. 1934)
  2013   – Ronald Shannon Jackson, American drummer and composer (b. 1940)
  2013   – Mikihiko Renjō, Japanese author (b. 1948)
  2013   – Mahmoud Zoufonoun, Iranian-American violinist and composer (b. 1920)
2014 – John Holt, Jamaican singer-songwriter (b. 1947)
  2014   – Stephen Paulus, American composer (b. 1949)
  2014   – Raphael Ravenscroft, English saxophonist and composer (b. 1954)
  2014   – Serena Shim, Lebanese-American journalist (b. 1984)
2015 – Bill Daley, American football player and sportscaster (b. 1919)
  2015   – Fleming Mackell, Canadian ice hockey player and singer (b. 1929)
  2015   – Ali Treki, Libyan politician and diplomat, Libyan Minister of Foreign Affairs (b. 1938)
2016 – Phil Chess, Czech-American record producer, co-founded Chess Records (b. 1921)
  2016   – Giovanni Steffè, Italian rower (b. 1928)
2017 – Umberto Lenzi, Italian film director (b. 1931)
2019 – Deborah Orr, Scottish journalist (b. 1962)
2021 – Jack Angel, American voice actor (b. 1930)

Holidays and observances
Christian feast day:
Aaron (Coptic Orthodox Church of Alexandria)
Aquilinus of Évreux
Desiderius (Didier) of Auxerre
Frideswide
Henry Martyn (Anglican Communion)
Isaac Jogues, Jean de Brébeuf, and Companions
Blessed Jerzy Popiełuszko
Paul of the Cross
Ptolemaeus and Lucius
Varus
Veranus of Cavaillon
William Carey (Episcopal Church)
October 19 (Eastern Orthodox liturgics)
Constitution Day, in honor of the country's independence (self-governing in free association with New Zealand) in 1974. (Niue)
Oxfordshire Day

References

External links

 
 
 

Days of the year
October